Cristobal López (18th century) (died 1730) was a Spanish painter. He was the son of Josef López of Seville, and Cristobal painted largely for the South American market, and painted in fresco in the church of All Saints, a giant St. Christopher and a Last Supper.

References

Painters from Seville
18th-century Spanish painters
18th-century Spanish male artists
Spanish male painters
Spanish Baroque painters
1730 deaths
Year of birth unknown
Fresco painters